Miarka may refer to:

 Miarka (novel), an 1883 novel by Jean Richepin
 Miarka (play), a 1905 play by Jean Richepin based on his novel
 Miarka (1920 film), a French silent film directed by Louis Mercanton
 Miarka (1937 film), a French film directed by Jean Choux